Chain of Evidence is a 2007 Ned Kelly Award-winning novel by the Australian author Garry Disher.

Story outline
Hal Challis is head of a crime investigation unit for Victoria Police, based on the Mornington Peninsula.  He has traveled back to his hometown of Mawsons Bluff in South Australia to be with his father who is dying. While there he investigates the disappearance of his sister's husband, missing for five years.

Back in Mornington Ellen Destry is filling in for Challis and house-sitting for him.  She is investigating the disappearance of a child walking home from school.

Awards
Ned Kelly Award, Best novel, 2007: winner

Notes
This is the fourth novel in the author's "Challis/Destry" series of crime novels, following The Dragon Man (1999), Kittyhawk Down (2003), and  Snapshot (2005).

Reviews
Jeff Glorfeld, in The Age, noted the police procedural nature of the novel: "Down on the Mornington Peninsula, Garry Disher has again stripped away the pretty scenery to reveal the often grim lives of people on the fringes. Through the eyes of the men and women staffing the Waterloo police station we see the violence and desperation, and the anger - of the citizens in their homes and on the streets, and in their own lives in particular. There's nothing glamorous or even particularly fulfilling about this kind of police work...It is a triumph for Disher that such a bleak scenario becomes an enthralling piece of entertainment. It's all about the people, of course. Newcomers can certainly start here - and this is by far Disher's best yet in the series - but there's no denying that having come this far with Challis and Co adds a lot to the experience. But taken as a whole, this instalment puts Disher up on the world stage among the best in the business at this style of crime fiction."
 
In The Sydney Morning Herald Sue Turnbull was impressed with the work: "Multilayered and multistranded, Chain of Evidence is written in vivid and uncompromising prose. A writer of both literary fiction and prize-winning children's books, Disher never skimps on his craft. Most impressive are the descriptions of landscape and place written with the precision of a social anthropologist and the vision of a poet."

References

Australian crime novels
2007 Australian novels
Ned Kelly Award-winning works
Soho Press books
Novels set in South Australia
Novels set in Victoria (Australia)